Shrum is an unincorporated community in the southeastern part of Crooked Creek Township in Bollinger County, Missouri, United States. Shrum, which lies 5 1/2 miles east of Bessville, was established in 1900, and the community was named for a local landowner, Nicholas Shrum. The community's post office was in operation between the years of 1898–1937.

References 

Unincorporated communities in Bollinger County, Missouri
Cape Girardeau–Jackson metropolitan area
Unincorporated communities in Missouri